The Intrigue is a surviving 1916 silent film drama produced by Pallas Pictures and released through Paramount Pictures. Frank Lloyd directed the film which was written by Julia Crawford Ivers and photographed by her son James Van Trees. The star is young Lenore Ulric and a young unknown King Vidor makes one of his earliest appearances in a film as an actor. The movie is also one of the earliest surviving films of Vidor's wife Florence. The film is extant at the Library of Congress along with several early Lloyd directed films from 1915/16.

Cast
Lenore Ulric - Countess Sonia Varnli
Cecil Van Auker - Guy Longstreet
Howard Davies - Baron Rogniat
Florence Vidor - Pseudo Countess Sonia
Paul Weigel - Attache to the Baron
Herbert Standing - The Emperor

unbilled
Dustin Farnum
Winifred Kingston
King Vidor

References

External links

The Intrigue at IMDb.com
The Intrigue ; allmovie.com synopsis

1916 films
American silent feature films
Films directed by Frank Lloyd
Films based on short fiction
1916 drama films
Silent American drama films
American black-and-white films
1910s American films